The ninth Mandala of the Rigveda, also called the Soma Mandala, has 114 hymns, entirely (although Griffith marks 9.5 as dedicated to the Apris) devoted to , "Purifying Soma", the sacred potion of the Vedic religion. 
Similar to Mandala 8, it cannot be dated within the relative chronology of the Rigveda as a whole; dealing with the Soma cult, a practice reaching back into Proto-Indo-Iranian times (late 3rd millennium BC), some of its hymns may contain the very oldest parts of the Rigveda, while other hymns may be rather recent relative to the other books. As with book 8, each hymn should be studied independently, since the Soma Mandala was not compiled by the redactors in its preserved form on grounds of authorship or clan affiliation, but topically, grouping the Soma hymns.

List of incipits
 9.1 (713) 
 9.2 (714) 
 9.3 (715) 
 9.4 (716) 
 9.5 (717) 
 9.6 (718) 
 9.7 (719) 
 9.8 (720) 
 9.9 (721) 
 9.10 (722) 
 9.11 (723) 
 9.12 (724) 
 9.13 (725) 
 9.14 (726) 
 9.15 (727) 
 9.16 (728) 
 9.17 (729) 
 9.18 (730) 
 9.19 (731) 
 9.20 (732) 
 9.21 (733) 
 9.22 (734) 
 9.23 (735) 
 9.24 (736) 
 9.25 (737) 
 9.26 (738) 
 9.27 (739) 
 9.28 (740) 
 9.29 (741) 
 9.30 (742) 
 9.31 (743) 
 9.32 (744) 
 9.33 (745) 
 9.34 (746) [Some Pavamana.]  
 9.35 (747) 
 9.36 (748) 
 9.37 (749) 
 9.38 (750) 
 9.39 (751) 
 9.40 (752) 
 9.41 (753) 
 9.42 (754) 
 9.43 (755) 
 9.44 (756) 
 9.45 (757) 
 9.46 (758) 
 9.47 (759) 
 9.48 (760) 
 9.49 (761) 
 9.50 (762) 
 9.51 (763) 
 9.52 (764) 
 9.53 (765) 
 9.54 (766) 
 9.55 (767) 
 9.56 (768) 
 9.57 (769) 
 9.58 (770) 
 9.59 (771) 
 9.60 (772) 
 9.61 (773) 
 9.62 (774) 
 9.63 (775) [Soma Pavanana.] 
 9.64 (776) 
 9.65 (777) 
 9.66 (778) 
 9.67 (779) [Soma and Others.] 
 9.68 (780) 
 9.69 (781) 
 9.70 (782) 
 9.71 (783) 
 9.72 (784) 
 9.73 (785) 
 9.74 (786) 
 9.75 (787) 
 9.76 (788) 
 9.77 (789) 
 9.78 (790) 
 9.79 (791) 
 9.80 (792) 
 9.81 (793) 
 9.82 (794) 
 9.83 (795) 
 9.84 (796) 
 9.85 (797) 
 9.86 (798) 
 9.87 (799) 
 9.88 (800) 
 9.89 (801) 
 9.90 (802) 
 9.91 (803) 
 9.92 (804) 
 9.93 (805) 
 9.94 (806) 
 9.95 (807) 
 9.96 (808) 
 9.97 (809) 
 9.98 (810) 
 9.99 (811) 
 9.100 (812) 
 9.101 (813) 
 9.102 (814) 
 9.103 (815) 
 9.104 (816) 
 9.105 (817) 
 9.106 (818) 
 9.107 (819) 
 9.108 (820) 
 9.109 (821) 
 9.110 (822) 
 9.111 (823) 
 9.112 (824) 
 9.113 (825) 
 9.114 (826)

External links 

 – English translation by Ralph T. H. Griffith

Rigveda
Soma (drink)